T. J. Wright (born November 29, 1983) is a former American football cornerback. He was signed by the Cincinnati Bengals as an undrafted free agent in 2007. He played college football at Ohio.

He has also been a member of the Florida Tuskers.

Early years
Wright was an All-District, All-State cornerback at Clifton J. Ozen Magnet High School Beaumont, Texas. Wright was named most athletic his senior year after being a 4 sport varsity athlete. Wright also began recording at the local Parkdale mall as well as designing T-shirts for the local group then known as S.T.Y.

College career
As a senior with the Ohio Bobcats, Wright started all 14 games and earned first-team All-MAC honors from the league's coaches.  He was, also, named All-MAC by Collegefootballnews.com, which rated him as the second-best defensive back in the league and one of the top 30 best football players regardless of position. Wright was named MAC East Division Player of the Week after recording seven tackles, two pass break-ups, a forced fumble and a fumble recovery at Miami. He led all Ohio defensive backs, and ranked third on the team overall, with 59 tackles. He ranked first on the team with four interceptions and was the first Bobcat since Bop White (1999–2002) to notch four straight seasons with at least three interceptions. In his senior season, Wright helped lead the Bobcats to a MAC East Division title, a MAC Championship Game appearance, a GMAC Bowl appearance and accepted an invitation to play in the inaugural    Texas vs The Nation All-Star game in El Paso, TX.

Professional career

Cincinnati Bengals
Wright was signed by the Bengals as an undrafted free agent on April 30, 2007. He was released on November 12, 2007.

Florida Tuskers
Wright was drafted by the Florida Tuskers of the United Football League in the UFL Premiere Season Draft in 2009. He signed with the team on August 17.

Music
Wright is an independent hip rock artist in the band Orion's Belt as well as an independent solo artist.

Fashion
After attending Miami International School of Art and Design Wright began to design luxury shoes and accessories operating under a created private label. After initially designing luxurious women's shoes as merchandise for his band to separate the now defunct Empire band from the consistent pattern of T-shirt and bottle caps as the only options a band had to offer fans, Wright received warm reactions from the Houston,Texas affluent that he created the Empire Collection accessories brand and the M•L•A•M (My Life's A Movie) luxury brand under the HEART Portfolio.

Technology
After losing his phone on a way to a football meeting, Wright developed the Locator1 wireless paging system first to allow himself to stop being late to important meetings due to something as simple as a cell phone. Wright soon discovered that 113 phones are lost every minute and has since filed a patent and taken the prototype into a full scale final design separating the Locator1 series from applications and external attachments by allowing phones to be located and retrieved despite battery life or ring tone/vibration loudness. The Locator1 computerized cell phone case launched the creation of Empire Tech.

References

External links
Ohio Bobcats bio
Just Sports Stats

1983 births
Living people
People from Webster, Texas
Players of American football from Texas
American football cornerbacks
Ohio Bobcats football players
Cincinnati Bengals players
Florida Tuskers players
Jacksonville Sharks players